USCGS Katherine Walker (WLM-552) is a Keeper-class coastal buoy tender of the United States Coast Guard. Her keel was laid on 8 April 1996 by Fincantieri Marine Group. Her namesake is Katherine Walker, the keeper of the Robbins Reef Light; Walker was responsible for saving the lives of 50 people. As well as keeping many ships away from the rocks. USCGC Katherine Walker is responsible for a total of 335 aids to navigation (ATON).

On September 11, 2001, the crew of the USCGS Katherine Walker planned and participated in the maritime evacuation of Lower Manhattan.

On April 4, 2017, the USCGS Katherine Walker responded to a potential environmental disaster on the Hudson River, near Catskill, New York, where a barge had run aground carrying 60,000 barrels of gasoline. A safety zone was established on the river, in the vicinity of the vessel, yet the barge's tanks had not been punctured and there was no leakage as a result of the accident.

References 

Ships of the United States Coast Guard
1996 ships
Keeper-class cutters
Ships built by Marinette Marine